WDE may refer to:

 Water droplet erosion
 Weak-side Defensive End, a position in American Football
 Edsall Class (WDE) A designation of U. S. Coast Guard Cutters